Judith Ellen Levy (born 1958) is an American lawyer and judge who has served as a United States district judge of the United States District Court for the Eastern District of Michigan since 2014.

Early life
Levy was born in 1958 in Bloomington, Indiana. She received a Bachelor of Science degree in 1981 from the University of Michigan and a Juris Doctor, cum laude, in 1996 from the University of Michigan Law School.
Levy worked at the University of Michigan Hospital and served as the bargaining chairman for Local 1583 of the American Federation of State, County and Municipal Employees for six years.

Levy is openly gay and has three daughters.

Legal career
From 1996 to 1999, she worked as a law clerk to Judge Bernard A. Friedman of the U.S. District Court for the Eastern District of Michigan. From 1999 to 2000, she was a trial attorney for the United States Equal Employment Opportunity Commission. From 2000 to 2014, Levy served as an Assistant United States Attorney in the Eastern District of Michigan, and was Chief of the Civil Rights Unit in 2010–2014.

Federal judicial service
On July 25, 2013, President Barack Obama nominated Levy to serve as a federal judge on the United States District Court for the Eastern District of Michigan, to the seat vacated by Judge Nancy Garlock Edmunds, who assumed senior status on August 1, 2012. A cloture vote on her nomination was invoked on March 11, 2014 by a 56–42 vote. On March 12, 2014, the U.S. Senate voted 97–0 for final confirmation. She received her judicial commission on March 14, 2014.

Notable ruling 

On November 10, 2021, Levy approved a $626 million settlement for the people of Flint who were affected by the Flint water crisis.

See also
 List of first women lawyers and judges in Michigan
 List of LGBT jurists in the United States

References

External links

1958 births
Living people
21st-century American judges
21st-century American women judges
American Federation of State, County and Municipal Employees people
Assistant United States Attorneys
Judges of the United States District Court for the Eastern District of Michigan
LGBT appointed officials in the United States
LGBT judges
LGBT lawyers
LGBT people from Michigan
LGBT people from Indiana
Michigan lawyers
People from Bloomington, Indiana
United States district court judges appointed by Barack Obama
University of Michigan Law School alumni
University of Michigan alumni